Francois Hermanus "Hottie" Louw  (born 2 March 1976) is a South African former rugby union player.

Playing career
Louw matriculated at Boland Agricultural High School and represented  at the annual Craven Week tournament in 1994 and was selected for the 1994 South African Schools team. He made his senior provincial debut for Western Province in 1996.

Louw toured with the Springboks in 2000 to Argentina, Britain and Ireland and played in four tour matches. In 2002 he made his test match debut for the Springboks against  at Newlands, as a replacement.

Test history

See also
List of South Africa national rugby union players – Springbok no. 704

References

1976 births
Living people
South African rugby union players
South Africa international rugby union players
Western Province (rugby union) players
Blue Bulls players
Boland Cavaliers players
Stormers players
ASM Clermont Auvergne players
Benetton Rugby players
Rugby union players from the Western Cape
Rugby union locks